Gerrit Möhlmann (born 2 August 1950) is a retired Dutch cyclist who was active between 1972 and 1989. On track he finished in fifth place in the 4 km team pursuit at the 1976 Summer Olympics. On the road he won the Stausee-Rundfahrt Klingnau in 1978 and Hel van het Mergelland in 1988, as well as individual stages of the Olympia's Tour (1978 and 1979).

Möhlmann is married to the cyclist Anne Riemersma. Their son Peter and daughter Pleuni are also professional cyclists.

See also
 List of Dutch Olympic cyclists

References

1950 births
Living people
Dutch male cyclists
Olympic cyclists of the Netherlands
Cyclists at the 1976 Summer Olympics
Sportspeople from Apeldoorn
Cyclists from Gelderland
20th-century Dutch people
21st-century Dutch people